Thai traditional costumes vary by city and the ruler of each historical period. Thai clothes can be classified according to six distinct periods of history; beginning with the 13th century. Previously, traditional Thai clothes were worn daily; however, they are now only worn on auspicious functions such as Thai traditional marriage ceremonies.

Sukhothai

Sukhothai clothing style became the fashion in 13-15th century. During the period The city-state of Sukhothai was united other Tai city-states into one kingdom. Sukhothai Men's clothing was a simple full sleeved top with a long V shape neck and a cloth brace on their shoulders. The loincloth was made of silk with a big metal or golden belt. Women's clothing was a long silk sarong with flowers painted on it. The top normally is a full sleeved silk cloth. Married women wore one cloth wrapped around the breasts made of silk or other fabric.

Ayutthaya

Ayutthaya clothing was the style during the 14-18th centuries. Ayutthaya city was the capital of Thai kingdom for 417 years, the longest period of Thailand that was ruled under one monarch. Many styles clothing followed the period of Ayutthaya but the fashion changed frequently under the influence from various countries who come into contact and trading with the kingdom.

Historically, both Thai males and females dressed themselves with a loincloth wrap called chong kraben. Men wore their chong kraben to cover the waist to halfway down the thigh, while women covered the waist to well below the knee. Bare chests and bare feet were accepted as part of the Thai formal dress code, and is observed in murals, illustrated manuscripts, and early photographs up to the middle of the 19th century. In the royal court, royalty and nobility men are wearing lomphok, a tall pointed hat, made of white cloth wrapped around a bamboo frame, and Khrui, a  light outer garment worn as a gown or robe in certain ceremonial settings. Traditional Thai attire has changed significantly throughout the Rattanakosin period.

Thonburi

Rattanakosin

Old Rattanakosin
Early Rattanakosin central Thais dressed as same as Ayutthaya period, however, after the Second Fall of Ayutthaya and repeated Burmese invasions, central Thai women began cutting their hair in a crew-cut short style, which remained the national hairstyle until the 1900s. Prior to the 20th century, the primary markers that distinguished class in Thai clothing were the use of cotton and silk cloths with printed or woven motifs, but both commoners and royals alike wore wrapped, not stitched clothing.

Modern Rattanakosin

From the 1860s onward, Thai royals "selectively adopted Victorian corporeal and sartorial etiquette to fashion modern personas that were publicized domestically and internationally by means of mechanically reproduced images." Stitched clothing, including court attire and ceremonial uniforms, were invented during the reign of King Chulalongkorn. Western forms of dress became popular among urbanites in Bangkok during this time period. During the early 1900s, King Vajiravudh launched a campaign to encourage Thai women to wear long hair instead of traditional short hair, and to wear pha sinh (ผ้าซิ่น), a tubular skirt, instead of the chong kraben (โจงกระเบน), a cloth wrap.

Fascist Thailand

On 15 January 1941, Plaek Pibulsonggram issued a Thai cultural mandate to modernize and westernize Thai dress, by deeming long-practiced customs of wearing underpants, wearing no shirt, or wearing a wraparound cloth, as forms of inappropriate public attire.

Contemporary Thai clothing

Although described and intended for use as national costume, they are of relatively modern origins, having been conceived in the second half of the 20th century.

See also 
 Traditional Thai clothing

References

External links
 
 
 
 
 การแต่งกายสมัยอยุธยา

Thai culture
Thai clothing
Thai history